William "Red" McNeal (1903 – date of death unknown) was an American baseball outfielder in the Negro leagues. He played with Baltimore Black Sox in 1930, the Louisville White Sox in 1930 and 1931, and the Louisville Black Caps in 1932.

References

External links
 and Baseball-Reference Black Baseball stats and Seamheads

Baltimore Black Sox players
Louisville White Sox players
Louisville Black Caps players
1903 births
Year of death unknown
Baseball players from Iowa
Baseball outfielders